Susarla is a Brahmin surname of Indian origin.

It is however most commonly found in India and refers to a larger trading family that traded in the historic Persian port of Bandar Abbas.
Most of the name "Susarla" now live in the diaspora, although a small number remain within the vicinity of the Indian state of Andhra Pradesh.

 Susarla Dakshinamurthi, an Indian musician.

Surnames of Indian origin